Rosana Rodríguez-López is a Spanish mathematician known for her well-cited research publications applying fixed-point theorems to differential equations. She is a professor in the Department of Statistics, Mathematical Analysis and Optimisation at the University of Santiago de Compostela, where she obtained her Ph.D. in 2005 under the supervision of Juan José Nieto Roig.

References

External links

Year of birth missing (living people)
Living people
21st-century Spanish mathematicians
Spanish women mathematicians
University of Santiago de Compostela alumni
Academic staff of the University of Santiago de Compostela